Chaenactis carphoclinia is a species of flowering plant in the daisy family known by the common name pebble pincushion. It is native to the southwestern United States and northwestern Mexico, where it grows in rocky and gravelly habitat, such as the California deserts. The species is found in southern California, Nevada, Utah, Arizona, southwestern New Mexico, Baja California, Sonora.

Description
Chaenactis carphoclinia, or pebble pincushion, is an annual herb growing an erect, branching stem up to about 60 centimeters (2 feet) in maximum height. The longest leaves are about 10 centimeters (4 inches) long and are usually divided into a few lobes. The inflorescence bears a few flower heads, each up to a centimeter wide. The head is lined with flat, sharp-pointed phyllaries which are reddish. The head contains several white or pink-tinted flowers with long, protruding anthers. The fruit is an achene a few millimeters in length tipped with a scaly pappus.

Varieties
There are two varieties of  Chaenactis carphoclinia:
Chaenactis carphoclinia var. carphoclinia is a smaller variety found throughout the species range
Chaenactis carphoclinia var. piersonii is a larger variety known only from the Santa Rosa Mountains in southern California

References

External links

Jepson Manual Treatment - Chaenactis carphoclinia
United States Department of Agriculture Plants Profile
Chaenactis carphoclinia - Calphotos Photo gallery, University of California

carphoclinia
Flora of Northwestern Mexico
Flora of the Southwestern United States
Flora of the California desert regions
Natural history of the Colorado Desert
Natural history of the Mojave Desert
Natural history of the Peninsular Ranges
Plants described in 1859
Flora without expected TNC conservation status